Sojka III is an unmanned aerial vehicle (UAV) operated by the Czech Army until it was decommissioned in December 2011.

Usage 
The mission of Sojka ("jaybird") is to provide aerial reconnaissance, radio reconnaissance, artillery fire observation, electronic warfare, or to launch infrared targets for air defence training.

A Sojka unit usually consists of three or four Sojka UAVs, a transport truck, launch truck, control and monitoring vehicle, and an off-road vehicle for transport of the landed UAV.

Flight 
The Sojka is launched from a ramp using a rocket-assisted device to get takeoff speed. Wind limits are 12 m/s against the wind or 3 m/s in a side wind. A wind speed of lower than 8 km/h is required to get a good optical environment.

The operator can choose between two modes:
 Semiautomatic – the operator can change the altitude and direction of the UAV
 Automatic – the operator can specify up to eight turning points. The operator can switch to semiautomatic mode or order plane to return to the starting point at any time.

Landing can be done using a parachute or via operator control.

Specifications (Sojka III)

External links 
 Czech Army info about Sojka

Unmanned aerial vehicles of the Czech Republic
Czech and Czechoslovakian military reconnaissance aircraft
Unmanned military aircraft